Abigail Strate (born 22 February 2001) is a Canadian ski jumper, born in Calgary, Alberta. Strate began ski jumping at six years old, and entered her first international competition when she was ten, in Utah. In her participation at the 2022 Beijing Winter Olympics, Strate won Canada's first Bronze medal in Ski jumping, in the mixed team event. Strate also notably ranked 23rd in the Women's Normal Hill Individual event, with a total of 161.9 points. In her free time, Strate enjoys spending time outside by mountain biking, beekeeping, gardening, and caring for her chickens.

Career
Strate competed in four events at the FIS Nordic World Ski Championships 2021, finishing 27th on the normal hill, 28th on the large hill, 11th on the women's team normal hill and finally 10th in the mixed team normal hill. 

Strate lives and trains in Slovenia for 8 months a year with the Canadian women's team, as the jumps at the Canada Olympic Park in Calgary were shut down.

2022 Winter Olympics
In January 2022, Strate was named to Canada's 2022 Olympic team. On February 7, Strate won the bronze medal as part of Canada's entry into the mixed team competition, alongside Mackenzie Boyd-Clowes, Alexandria Loutitt, and Matthew Soukup. This was Canada's first ever Olympic medal in the sport of ski jumping.

References

External links
 
 
 
 

2001 births
Living people
Sportspeople from Calgary
Canadian female ski jumpers
Ski jumpers at the 2022 Winter Olympics
Olympic ski jumpers of Canada
Olympic bronze medalists for Canada
Medalists at the 2022 Winter Olympics
Olympic medalists in ski jumping
Canadian expatriates in Slovenia
21st-century Canadian women